The Clausura 2017 Copa MX Final was the final of the Clausura 2017 Copa MX, the tenth edition of the Copa MX under its current format and 77th overall organized by the Mexican Football Federation, the governing body of association football in Mexico.

The final was contested in a single leg format between Liga MX clubs Guadalajara and Morelia. The match was hosted by Guadalajara at Estadio Chivas in the Guadalajara suburb of Zapopan on 19 April 2017.  As winners, Guadalajara earned a spot to face Querétaro (the winners of the Apertura 2016 edition) in the 2017 Supercopa MX.

Qualified teams

Venue

Due to the tournament's regulations the higher seed among both finalists during the group stage will host the final, thus Estadio Chivas hosted the final. Formerly named Estadio Omnilife, the venue has been home to Guadalajara since the Apertura 2010 season. The venue has hosted various other events such as the first leg of the 2010 Copa Libertadores Finals between Guadalajara and Brazilian club Internacional. The stadium also hosted eight matches of the 2011 FIFA U-17 World Cup, including the semifinal between Brazil and Uruguay. The stadium hosted the 2011 Pan American Games opening and closing ceremonies as well as both men's and women's football tournaments.

Background
Guadalajara has won the tournament three times while Morelia has won it once. This is Guadalajara's fourth Copa MX final in a two-year span, the last appearance being in the previous edition where they lost to Querétaro on penalty kicks. Morelia most recently reached the final in the Apertura 2013 where the defeated Atlas on penalty kicks to win their first Copa MX title.

Guadalajara won three, drew once and scored six goals during group stage and won their group. They eliminated UAT in the Round of 16, Juárez in the quarterfinals, and Monterrey in the semifinals.

Morelia won two, lost two, and scored six goals during group stage, as they ended second. They eliminated Toluca in the Round of 16, Tijuana in the quarterfinals and Cruz Azul in the semifinals.

Road to the finals
Note: In all results below, the score of the finalist is given first.

Match

Broadcasters
The match was not shown on any over-the-air or pay television networks in Mexico, instead it was shown on Chivas TV, Guadalajara's over-the-top (OTT) platform. Along with Chivas TV, the match was also streamed on Claro Video and Cinépolis Klic. On 12 April 2017, cinema chain Cinépolis announced the match will be shown in Cinépolis theaters across Mexico.

The match was shown on Univision Deportes Network in the United States.

References

Copa MX Finals
2016–17 in Mexican football
2017 in Mexican sports
Copa MX Final 2017 Clausura
C.D. Guadalajara matches
Atlético Morelia matches